Rank insignia in the French Army are worn on the sleeve or on shoulder marks of uniforms, and range up to the highest rank of Marshal of France, a state honour denoted with a seven-star insignia that was last conferred posthumously on Marie Pierre Koenig in 1984.

Infantry arms and cavalry arms 
Rank insignia in the French army depend on whether the soldier belongs to an infantry or cavalry unit. The infantry arms include normal infantry, naval troops, the Foreign Legion and engineers; cavalry arms include armoured cavalry, artillery, maintenance and logistics. Sleeves are emblazoned with marks denoting either gold insignia for the infantry or silver/white for the cavalry. However, the artillery uses gold as the main colour, despite being a cavalry branch, and spahis use gold as the main colour despite being part of the cavalry, a distinction representing the armoured cavalry.

Marshal

The title of "marshal of France" is awarded as a distinction, rather than a rank. The marshals wear seven stars and carry a baton.

As a distinction rather than a rank, the title of Marshal is granted through a special law voted by the French Parliament. For this reason, it is impossible to demote a Marshal. When he was tried for high treason, the judges were empowered to demote his other ranks and titles, but due to the principle of separation of powers, the judges had no authority to cancel the law that had made Pétain a Marshal and it remained the only title he kept after being sentenced.

Six marshals of France have been given the even more exalted rank of "Marshal General of France": Duke de Biron, Duke de Lesdiguières, Viscount de Turenne, de Villars, Count de Saxe and Jean-de-Dieu Soult.

Officers
Although they all wear the same insignia and titles, officers are divided into:
Regular officers of the army
Officers of the Armed Forces Commisariat Corps (formerly Army Commisariat Corps)
Officers of the technical and administrative corps of the armed forces (formerly of the Army)

- general officers

There is no distinction between infantry and cavalry generals, since they are all supposed to be able to command any type of unit. The rank was formerly designated as Lieutenant-General of the Armies until 1791. The official historic succession of the "Lieutenant-General of France" corresponded to Général de division for the French Army, and Vice-Amiral (Vice-Admiral) for the French Navy. The rank of Général de corps d'armée wasn't officially adopted until 1939, along with five other French Armed Forces ranks. It must also be noted that Army corps general and Army general are not really ranks, but styles and positions (Rang et appellation in french) bestowed upon a Divisional general, which is the highest substantive rank in the French Army.

- senior officers

- junior officers

- sub-officers, i.e. non-commissioned officers

Full  are experienced junior officers, served by sergeants when commanding their unit.

A four chevron  rank existed until 1947. It was a ceremonial rank usually given to the most senior or experienced NCO in a unit. It was discontinued in the post-war army due to its redundancy.

- Troop ranks
Junior enlisted grades have different cloth stripe and beret colour depending on the service they are assigned to.

A red beret indicates a paratrooper, whether from the "troupes de marine" or not. A legionnaire paratrooper wears a green beret with the general parachutist badge on it, the same badge used by all French Army paratroopers who completed their training.

Senior grades' lace stripe metal depends on their arm of service, just like the officiers. Infantry and support units wear gold stripes and cavalry and technical services units wear silver stripes.

  : No rank insignia. Depending on the arm, they are called
  (infantry)
  (French Foreign Legion)
  (artillery)
  (engineering, including the Paris Fire Brigade)
  ("hunter": light troops used for reconnaissance and harassment)
  (light infantry)
  (light mounted infantry)
  (light alpine infantry)
  (airborne infantry commandos)
  (dragoon: mounted infantry unit)
  (heavy cavalry unit)
  (hussar, light cavalry unit)
  (signals corps)
  (trains)
Slang
  (see Troupes de marine): A term either from the gunner's order to fire or a term for a species of winkle because they would stick to their emplacements and couldn't be removed easily.
  (French Colonial Forces): The former term for the  when they were colonial troops.
 : Airborne troops, short for "parachutist".
  (troupes aéroportées): Airborne troops "grunt". Friendly nickname.
  (literally "porpoise"; marines or naval infantry)
 : "Hairy one". A term that appeared during the First Empire and used to refer to the French soldiers as they often wore a beard and/or a moustache—and were represented that way on memorials. Nowadays, this term is used to refer to French soldiers who fought in the trenches of WW1, though it is seldom used to refer to WW2 soldiers. It is synonym of bravery and endurance.
Probably comes from the fact that ' and naval riflemen used to own their uniform and were proud of it, whereas other units were dressed in rags ( is an old French word for rag). This word is not used to designate a legionnaire.

There are also distinctions to distinguish volunteers and conscripts, and bars for experience (one for five years, up to four can be obtained).

Engineer officer ranks

Army Commissariat Service officer ranks 
These ranks apply the word  in light of their participation and role in the Commissariat Service of the army.

Military chaplains

Ranks formerly used in the Army 
  lowest general officer rank of the  Army.
 
  was a rank created in 1776 and was renamed  in 1928. Eventually promotions were put on hold in 1962. The rank was officially abolished in 1971, though present rank holders were allowed to continue to use it. The last  retired in 1985. 
 
 
  ("Conscript Sergeant" - Foot) /  ("Conscript Sergeant" - Horse) was a rank given to a conscript promoted to Sergeant while they were on National Service. A career  or  who had enlisted (who wore two lace chevrons instead of the conscript's one) would outrank them.    
 
 
  ("Quartermaster") - A  in charge of distributing rations, keeping the unit's accounts, and arranging and assigning living quarters when the company was on the march.
  (archaic)

See also 
 French Army

Notes

References

French Army Ranks
Military ranks of France
French Army Ranks